Elizabeth Anne Mould de Sodington Blount, Lady de Sodington Blount (born Elizabeth Anne Mould Williams lastly Elizabeth Anne Mould Morgan; 7 May 1850 – 2 January 1935) was an English pamphlet writer and social activist. She led a society who believed in a flat earth, and conducted experiments that sought to prove this.

Life
Blount was born in Lambeth in 1850. Her parents were Elizabeth Ann (born Mould) and James Zacharias Williams, who was a keen supporter of London clubs. She was tutored at home. She developed wide interests in art, science, social responsibility, and London's society and intelligentsia.

She married Sir Walter de Sodington Blount, 9th Baronet, and they raised a family at the family seat of Mawley Hall. She would spend time there and at their house in London where she was a fellow of the Royal Society of Literature and the Society of Antiquaries.

After Samuel Rowbotham's death in 1884, Blount became the President of the Universal Zetetic Society, whose objective was "the propagation of knowledge related to Natural Cosmogony in confirmation of the Holy Scriptures, based on practical scientific investigation". Blount's title and money was said to have attracted an archbishop, several colonels, a Major-General to the membership. The society published a magazine, The Earth Not a Globe Review, and remained active well into the early 20th century. A flat Earth journal, Earth: a Monthly Magazine of Sense and Science, was published between 1901 and 1904, edited by Lady Blount.

In 1898 she published a novel titled Adrian Galilio, or a Song Writer's Story. The Flat Earth Society says that it concerns "an aristocrat who escapes her unhappy marriage and reinvents herself as a world-famous Flat Earth proponent who 'tours Europe giving elaborate lectures on cosmology, the creation, true love and hell'".

Blount and her husband wanted to provide evidence of the earth's flat surface and they created experiments on the Old Bedford Level Canal over several weeks. 

Lady Blount published the pictures far and wide. Blount's letter did not discuss the effects of atmospheric refraction but the photographer noted a mirage which he described as "an aqueous shimmering vapour [appearing] to float unevenly on the surface of the canal".

These controversies became a regular feature in the English Mechanic magazine in 1904–05, which published Blount's photo and reported two experiments in 1905 that showed the opposite results. One of these, by Clement Stratton on the Ashby Canal, showed a dip on a sight-line only above the surface.

When she was 73, on 28 August 1923, she married again to a builder and evangelist named Stephen Morgan who was forty years younger than her. She was a member of the "Society for the Protection of the Dark Races" and she gave that her active support.

Blount died in Hayling Island.

See also
 Figure of the Earth
 Geodesy
 Hollow Earth
 Mark Sargent
 Modern flat Earth beliefs
 Samuel Rowbotham
 Samuel Shenton
  (documenting why the flat Earth belief is mistaken)
 Wilbur Glenn Voliva

References

Flat Earth proponents
People from Lambeth
English activists
1850 births
1935 deaths
Wives of baronets